The  Missouri lunar sample displays are two commemorative plaques consisting of small fragments of Moon specimen brought back with the Apollo 11 and Apollo 17 lunar missions and given in the 1970s to the people of the state of Missouri by United States President Richard Nixon as goodwill gifts.

Description

Apollo 11

Apollo 17

History 

In May 2010, The Record of Hackensack, a newspaper in northern New Jersey, reported that Missouri's "goodwill Moon rock" was lost and its location was unknown. The Missouri State Museum claimed its "goodwill Moon rock" was at the Missouri State Capitol. The newspaper's pictures of the "goodwill Moon rock" were shown to Joseph Gutheinz, a former special agent with NASA's Office of Inspector General and a self-appointed investigator on the Apollo lunar sample displays. When he saw the pictures, he said they were pictures of the Apollo 11 moon rocks. A spokesman for the museum said it had no records of the Apollo 17 display.

The Apollo 17 display was later found in Bond's office and given to Governor Jay Nixon, who gave it to the Missouri State Museum, where it is displayed with the Apollo 11 "goodwill Moon rocks".

See also
 List of Apollo lunar sample displays

References

Further reading 

 
 

Stolen and missing moon rocks
Missouri culture